Joyland is a historic free entry amusement park located in Great Yarmouth, Norfolk, on the coast of East Anglia. The theme park opened in 1949 on the site of the former Anchor Gardens next to Britannia Pier.

The park is famous locally and across the country for the Snails and Tyrolean Tubs rides designed and manufactured by engineering entrepreneur Horace Cole and the family-owned engineering business. The Tyrolean Tubs is notable as the only Virginia Reel roller coaster (albeit in miniature form) in operation in the world.

Joyland is renowned for its heritage rides, which have remained unchanged through generations of patrons, allowing parents to share the rides remembered from their childhood with their children.

The biggest change to the park occurred in 1984 when the main centerpiece of the park (a 1950s Noah's Ark ride) was removed and replaced with a space shuttle attraction called the "Space Base" and then again in 1996 when the centrepiece was demolished and replaced by a spooky themed roller coaster twisting around the peak of the mountain while various fiberglass toy figurines adorn the side of the large green mountain.

Current rides and attractions
, Joyland hosts the following rides: 
 Snails (1949)
 A unique snail ride designed by Horace Cole travelling through the park with various scenic elements such as garden gnomes, Frogs, A pond and much more. 
 Tyrolean Tubs (1949)

 Circular "Tubs" wind their way through mountainous scenery spinning and changing direction unexpectedly throughout the duration of the ride before returning to the station. Designed by Horace Cole.
 Jet Cars (mid-1970s)
 Six jet cars travel on a circular track through the inside of the mountain.
 Neptune's Kingdom (mid-1970s)
 A themed ride whereby the rider travels through the inside of the "Mountain" in a seahorse car through sea and water related scenery.
 Pirate Ship (1986)
 A pirate ship swings up and down entertaining children and adults. 
 Major Orbit (1989)
 A circular space-themed children's ride which spins and tilts upward.
 Junior Ferris Wheel (c. 1990)
 A small Ferris wheel looking over Great Yarmouth Beach. 
 Skydiver (c. 1990)
 An enclosed ride spins riders up in the air imitating that of a skydiver. 
 Spook Express (1996)
 A children's rollercoaster travelling around the summit of the "Mountain", Curving inwards through a dark cave where spooky sound effects play in the darkness.

Gallery

See also
 List of British Theme Parks

References 

Amusement parks in England
Tourist attractions in Norfolk
Great Yarmouth